The UFM Easy Riser is an American swept wing biplane hang glider that was first powered in 1975, becoming the first modern ultralight aircraft. The Easy Riser was still in production as an unpowered glider in 2002 by Ultralight Flying Machines.

Design and development
The Easy Riser was developed by Larry Mauro from the earlier Kiceniuk Icarus II biplane hang glider. An engine was installed by John Moody in 1975 so the glider could be launched from flat terrain.

Early powered versions consisted simply of a motor added to the foot-launched hang glider version with control by a combination of weight shift for pitch and tip rudders for roll and yaw, with the tip rudders used together as air brakes. Because many pilots could not run fast enough to achieve take-off, wheeled tricycle gear was added. The aircraft exhibited poor pitch stability, so a horizontal stabilizer and elevator were added. Finally, on later versions, the tip rudders were replaced with a tail-mounted rudder.

The Easy Riser is constructed with an aluminium structure and stamped ribs, covered in doped aircraft fabric covering, Mylar or other coverings. The pilot sits on a fabric sling seat. Engines used include the  McCulloch MAC-101,  Hirth F-36 and Solo 210.

Easy Risers were produced in large numbers until the ultralight market downturn of the early 1980s when the type was taken out of production. Later, the unpowered glider version was put back into limited production.

In 1979, Larry Mauro installed solar cells and an electric motor on a stock Easy Riser and the resulting Mauro Solar Riser become the first solar powered aircraft to carry a person aloft.

Aircraft on Display
Canadian Air & Space Museum - Easy Riser used by Bill Lishman in projects to teach birds to migrate
EAA AirVenture Museum - two Easy Risers and the Solar Riser.
US Southwest Soaring Museum - Easy Riser

Specifications (Easy Riser ultralight)

Notable appearances in media

See also

References

External links

Photo of John Moody flying his Easy Rider

1970s United States ultralight aircraft
Biplanes
Aircraft first flown in 1975
Tailless aircraft
Single-engined pusher aircraft